Charles Town is a city in Jefferson County, West Virginia, United States, and is also the county seat. The population was 6,534 at the 2020 census. It is named for its founder Charles Washington, youngest brother of President George Washington.

History

18th century

"Charlestown" was established by an act of the Virginia General Assembly in January 1787. However, for about two decades, confusion arose because the same name was also used for a town established in Ohio County at the mouth of Buffalo Creek, and authorized in the 1791 term of that local court. That area in 1797 became known as Brooke County, with that "Charlestown" as its county seat until a December 27, 1816 act of the Virginia General Assembly changed its name to Wellsburg, to honor a trader and his son.

Charles Washington, the founder of Charles Town, was born in Hunting Creek, now Fairfax County, Virginia, on May 2, 1738. He was the youngest full brother of George Washington. He came to what is today Jefferson County between April and October 1780. The estate of Charles Washington, Happy Retreat, was erected in 1780. In 1786, on 80 acres (320,000 m2) of his adjoining land, Charles laid out the streets of Charles Town, naming many of them after his brothers and one after his wife, Mildred. He donated the four corner lots at the intersection of George and Washington Streets for public buildings of the town and county, provided the town become the seat of the county separated from Berkeley County,

In 1794, James Madison married "Dolly" Todd at Harewood, the home of George Steptoe Washington, son of George Washington's brother Colonel Samuel Washington, just outside Charles Town.

19th century

Jefferson County was formed in 1801 as Charles Washington had anticipated. The county court house stands on one of the lots he donated, as did the jail until 1919, when it was demolished and replaced by the Post Office.

Charles Washington died sometime between July and September, 1799, only a short while before the death of his brother George. Charles' and his wife Mildred's grave sites near Evitts Run have recently been located and surrounded by a stone wall.

In 1844, the first issue of the Spirit of Jefferson newspaper was published in Charles Town by James W. Beller. It is the oldest newspaper in the state still (2020) being published.

The insurrection was quickly put down and John Brown and his six captured associates were tried in the Jefferson County Courthouse for treason, murder, and fomenting a slave insurrection; all were found guilty and were hanged at the location occupied today by the Gibson-Todd House. Brown's trial and execution brought the national press and many other visitors to Charles Town. During the six weeks between Brown's arrest (October 19) and his execution (December 2) Charles Town was an armed military camp; hundreds of soldiers were stationed there to prevent a rescue of Brown, and a cannon was placed in front of the courthouse. See Virginia v. John Brown.

During the first two years of the Civil War, the front lines of the Union and Confederate armies in the area fluctuated and the town frequently changed hands during the military engagements in the surrounding areas, with the town first occupied by Confederate troops, then Union troops, then back to Confederate until 1863 when Union troops occupied the town for the remainder of the war.

In 1883, the Valley Telephone Company was incorporated in West Virginia and began installing telephone lines throughout Jefferson County. The company's main office was in Charles Town.

A writer in 1898 commented as follows:

20th century
In 1922, Bill Blizzard, a leader of striking coal miners during the Battle of Blair Mountain, was charged with treason and murder for engaging in warfare against state and federal troops in Mingo and Logan Counties. He was tried in the Jefferson County courthouse in Charles Town and was found not guilty.

The Charles Town Race Track first opened in 1933. It was built on land purchased from the Charles Town Horse Show Association. In 1999, the Charles Town Race Track underwent major renovation which included a large addition to house video slot machines. It was renamed Charles Town Races & Slots. It became the Hollywood Casino at Charles Town Races on July 2, 2010.

In 1975, the new Jefferson Memorial Hospital opened, replacing the old Charles Town General Hospital. It is now part of the West Virginia University Hospitals (WVUH-East) chain of health care facilities, and was renamed Jefferson Medical Center in 2013.

21st century
Charles Town's population has more than doubled since 2000, due in part to annexation of housing subdivisions that have been developed on land around the original city.

Geography and climate
Charles Town is located in the lower Shenandoah Valley at  (39.284237, -77.856211).

Charles Town is located 73 miles northwest of Washington, D.C. and 75 miles west of Baltimore.

Due to its low elevation for West Virginia, Charles Town is on the northern extent of the Humid Subtropical climate zone, having cool to mildly cold winters and hot and humid summers. Precipitation is evenly distributed throughout the year, providing lush, abundant plant growth.

Transportation

Charles Town is served primarily by two main highways, U.S. Route 340 and West Virginia Route 9, which run concurrently for a short stretch in the vicinity of Charles Town. US 340 travels in a general southwest to northeast direction, connecting Charles Town to locations in the eastern Shenandoah Valley of Virginia to the southwest. To the northeast, US 340 provides direct access to Harpers Ferry and Frederick. WV 9 traverses the region with a northwest-to-southeast orientation, connecting Charles Town to Martinsburg and Leesburg. Additional highways serving Charles Town include West Virginia Route 51 and West Virginia Route 115.

Demographics

2010 census
As of the census of 2010, there were 5,259 people, 2,011 households, and 1,289 families living in the city. The racial makeup of the city was 76.9% White, 13.3% African American, 0.3% Native American, 2.1% Asian, 0.1% Pacific Islander, 3.7% from other races, and 3.6% from two or more races. Hispanic or Latino of any race were 9.0% of the population.

There were 2,011 households, of which 37.2% had children under the age of 18 living with them, 47.3% were married couples living together, 11.1% had a female householder with no husband present, 5.7% had a male householder with no wife present, and 35.9% were non-families. 28.7% of all households were made up of individuals, and 10.1% had someone living alone who was 65 years of age or older. The average household size was 2.57 and the average family size was 3.19.

The median age in the city was 35.5 years. 26.9% of residents were under the age of 18; 6.9% were between the ages of 18 and 24; 31.4% were from 25 to 44; 22.5% were from 45 to 64; and 12.4% were 65 years of age or older. The gender makeup of the city was 48.9% male and 51.1% female.

2000 census
As of the census of 2000, there were 2,907 people, 1,285 households, and 732 families living in the city. The racial makeup of the city was 78.91% White, 17.54% African American, 0.10% Native American, 1.03% Asian, 0.03% Pacific Islander, 0.62% from other races, and 1.75% from two or more races. Hispanic or Latino of any race were 2.55% of the population.

There were 1,285 households, out of which 25.8% had children under the age of 18 living with them, 39.5% were married couples living together, 13.5% had a female householder with no husband present, and 43.0% were non-families. 36.0% of all households were made up of individuals, and 19.4% had someone living alone who was 65 years of age or older. The average household size was 2.26 and the average family size was 2.95.

In the city, the population was spread out, with 22.9% under the age of 18, 8.6% from 18 to 24, 27.4% from 25 to 44, 22.5% from 45 to 64, and 18.5% who were 65 years of age or older. The median age was 39 years. For every 100 females, there were 89.0 males. For every 100 females age 18 and over, there were 85.2 males.

The median income for a household in the city was $32,538, and the median income for a family was $43,547. Males had a median income of $30,917 versus $22,241 for females. The per capita income for the city was $18,104. About 13.2% of families and 15.8% of the population were below the poverty line, including 20.3% of those under age 18 and 13.4% of those age 65 or over.

Notable people
 John Peale Bishop, author
 John Brown, tried and hanged in Charles Town, 1859
Sammi Brown, former member of the West Virginia House of Delegates
 Frank Buckles, longest-surviving American veteran of World War I
 Martin Delany, abolitionist, physician, leader in the Black Nationalism movement
 Warren B. English, politician
 Jack W. Germond, political reporter and commentator
 Gary Gregor, NBA player 
 James Jett, NFL player
 Hamilton Hatter, born enslaved, faculty member and trustee, Storer College; founder of Bluefield Colored Institute, later Bluefield State College
 John H. Hill, former slave, first African-American lawyer admitted to the Jefferson County bar; second president of West Virginia State University
 Samuel Mason, Revolutionary War soldier and early American outlaw
 Frederick Mayer, German-born Jewish agent of the OSS during World War II
William McSherry, Jesuit and president of Georgetown University
 Alex Mooney, U.S. Congressman for West Virginia's 2nd congressional district
Frank R. Stockton, author, most famous for the short story "The Lady, or the Tiger?"
 David Hunter Strother, also known as Porte Crayon, artist, author, soldier, statesman (Consul General to Mexico City)
 Edward Tiffin, first governor of Ohio
 Samuel Washington, George Washington's brother, lived in Charles Town at Harewood
 William Lyne Wilson, Postmaster General of the United States
 Thomas Worthington, sixth governor of Ohio and one of the first senators from Ohio

Schools

See also
Charles Town Cave
Charles Town Cannons
Journey Through Hallowed Ground National Heritage Area
Virginia v. John Brown

References

External links

 
 

Charles Town, West Virginia
Cities in West Virginia
Cities in Jefferson County, West Virginia
Washington metropolitan area